James Anthony Richard Lentjes (born 16 January 1991) is a New Zealand rugby union player who currently for  the Bunnings NPC and the Highlanders in Super Rugby. His position is Flanker.

Early career
Born and raised in the city of Christchurch in the South Island of New Zealand, Lentjes was educated at St Bede's College in his hometown where he won a  secondary schools title in 2008. After finishing school, he made his way through the  system, becoming a member of their wider training group in 2013 as well as playing for the Crusaders development team. He played club rugby in Canterbury with the university club, however due to a lack of opportunities to make the star studded Canterbury ITM Cup side, he headed south to Dunedin and began playing club rugby for Taieri. He holds a university degree in geology and geography and worked as a lab technician for Fulton Hogan prior to his rugby career.

Senior career
His move to Dunedin quickly paid off and after one season in club rugby, he made the Otago squad for the 2014 ITM Cup and went on to play eight games in his debut season, scoring one try. In Round 8 of the 2021 Bunnings NPC Lentjes played his 50th game for Otago against  at Forsyth Barr Stadium, Otago winning in a thriller 22–20.

Super Rugby
Following a string of injuries, Lentjes was called into the  squad midway through the 2015 Super Rugby season, making his debut in a 39–21 victory over the Stormers on March 28.

He was a consistent performer for the side during the 2017, 2018 and 2019 seasons and was rewarded in 2020 - being named as the Highlanders captain, however his season was cut short in only his fourth game as he suffered a horrific ankle injury ruling him out for the rest of the year.

References

External links

New Zealand rugby union players
Otago rugby union players
Highlanders (rugby union) players
1991 births
Living people
Rugby union flankers
Rugby union players from Christchurch
People educated at St Bede's College, Christchurch